Las Derrumbadas (from Spanish, meaning 'the collapsed ones' or 'the ones that suffered a stonefall') is a rhyolitic twin dome volcano in the Mexican state of Puebla. Often overlooked for its proximity to some of the country's most famous mountains —including Cofre de Perote, Sierra Negra and colossal Pico de Orizaba— its two summits are nevertheless within the top 30 of the country's highest mountain peaks.

Officially, both mountains are individually called Cerro Derrumbadas. To distinguish them, they are called Derrumbada Roja or Derrumbada de Fuego (Red or Fire Derrumbada, southeastern cone, 3480 m a.s.l.), and Derrumbada Azul or Derrumbada de Agua (Blue or Water Derrumbada, northwestern cone, 3420 m a.s.l.) by the locals. A third mountain, nearby Cerro Pinto, is often included in the Derrumbadas complex, under the name of Derrumbada Blanca (White Derrumbada, 3000 m a.s.l.).

Due to the volcano's fumarolic activity, it has been studied and proposed as a source of geothermal energy.

See also
 Oriental Basin
 List of mountain peaks of Mexico

External links

References

Active volcanoes
Mountains of Mexico
Stratovolcanoes of Mexico
Trans-Mexican Volcanic Belt
Landforms of Puebla
Geography of Mesoamerica
North American 3000 m summits